Euchromius hampsoni is a species of moth in the family Crambidae. It is found in Niger.

The length of the forewings is about 14 mm. The groundcolour of the forewings is creamy white, densely suffused with ochreous to dark brown scales. The hindwings are creamy white to light brown with a darkly bordered termen. Adults have been recorded in July.

References

Crambinae
Moths described in 1921
Endemic fauna of Niger
Moths of Africa